Benthimermithida is an order of nematodes belonging to the class Chromadorea.

Families:
 Benthimermithidae Petter, 1980

References

Nematodes